ITV Border, previously Border Television and commonly referred to as simply Border, is the Channel 3 service provided by ITV Broadcasting Limited for the England/Scotland border region, covering most of Cumbria, Dumfries and Galloway, the Scottish Borders and parts of Northumberland. The TV service previously covered the Isle of Man from 26 March 1965 until 15 July 2009.

Border Television was taken over by Granada plc in 2001 and a year later, as part of a network-wide re-launch, the name Border Television was dropped from on-air presentation, continuity and idents before networked programming in favour of the national ITV1 brand (ITV1 Border was used before regional programming). The licence for the region was transferred from Border Television to ITV Broadcasting Limited in November 2008. The legal name of the company was changed on 29 December 2006 from Border Television Ltd to ITV Border Ltd. The company was dissolved on 7 February 2023.

As of 25 February 2009, the regional news programme Lookaround was broadcast from the studios of ITV Tyne Tees in Gateshead with news and advertising staff based at offices in Carlisle and Edinburgh. However, on 16 September 2013, a full regional news service for the Border region was restored as part of an extensive relaunch of the station's local programming. A sub-regional service for the south of Scotland was reintroduced in January 2014. (The third channel in the rest of Scotland is STV.)

History

Launch
In May 1960, the Independent Television Authority (ITA) invited applicants to provide the ITV service for the Borders region – an area that covered the English counties of Westmorland and Cumberland, the south of Scotland and later, the Isle of Man.

Prior to this, the ITA had moved away from the idea of satellite stations (companies owned by distant management as seen with Southern Television in the south of England) towards companies that had strong local ownership. The contract covered two new transmitters at Caldbeck, near Carlisle and Selkirk, near Saint Boswells in the Scottish Borders. Granada Television and ABC Weekend Television had laid a claim to providing service via Caldbeck whilst Scottish Television expressed a strong interest in Selkirk. The ITA rejected both these in favour of a new contract area and a new company to serve it – although they stipulated the area to be "marginal" in their plans and that applicants had to present a very strong business case for the area as well as the contract.

Two applications were received, one from Solway Television and another from Border Television. Border were chosen on the basis of their plans and management which was considered local but still featured names from large business (the then chairman of Reuters for example) and from the world of education.

Launch was scheduled for February 1961 but construction problems with both transmitters resulted in delays until May of that year. As this led into the summer holiday period, Border asked for a launch delay as the break would affect advertising revenue. Accordingly, Border launched on Friday 1 September 1961, the 14th ITV station to go to air.

During its first year of operation, Border made a profit unlike other regional companies in their initial year, and by its second year, it had covered its launch costs, due mainly to a 60% audience penetration in an area that, at the time, was largely ignored by the BBC. From Friday 26 March 1965, the Isle of Man was added to Border's coverage area.

1970s and 1980s
Initially, Border produced little for the network and concentrated on local programming, most notably its flagship local news programme Lookaround. Later, when ITV and the BBC were given permission to extend broadcasting hours to daytime, Border carved a niche for providing the ITV network with afternoon quizzes and light entertainment. Derek Batey, Border TV's Assistant Controller of Programmes, became the frontman for one of ITV's most popular daytime quiz shows of the 1970s and early 1980s, Mr. and Mrs.. (A separate version of Mr. and Mrs. was also produced by HTV at the same time.) Batey also presented and produced the long-running chat show Look Who's Talking. Meanwhile, a 15-minute music show, The Sound of ..., was seen across several ITV regions and featured The Spinners, British folk music band The Settlers and other similar artists.

Financial and industrial problems began to hit the company during the 1970s – a fall in net profits to just £13,587, led to job losses and a cut in programme production in September 1975. In November 1978, a dispute with the ACTT (Association of Cinematograph, Television and Allied Technicians) led to 40 staff at the Durranhill studios being locked out for three weeks by management – several members of staff resorted to a sit in until the strike ended in stalemate and compromise.

By 1980, Border was again in severe financial trouble owing to a national economic downturn which affected advertising revenue on the whole ITV network, with the station losing £70,000 before tax in October 1981. The situation was deemed so serious that at one point the company considered not re-applying for its licence when it expired in December 1981 – though it would prove successful, as it did in July 1967 and October 1991. From January 1982, Border began broadcasting to south Cumbria from the Kendal transmitter which previously carried Granada. Border had lobbied the IBA for over a decade to serve the southern Lake District – a move backed by Cumbria County Council – while on the Isle of Man, officials voiced a preference to switch signals to Granada, citing inclusion in regional news coverage would benefit the tourism industry, with direct ferry links from Liverpool and Heysham.

More industrial problems were to follow in November 1982 when Border closed for a month in a dispute over new technology, which ended only after letters asking for an improvement in industrial relations were withdrawn. The dispute led to several members of management resigning – with Jim Graham moving from the BBC to become managing director and Paul Corley joining as director of programming. Graham and Corley began to transform Border by targeting a greater presence on the ITV network, despite the company's weak financial position. Graham hired Melvyn Bragg to present new programming. The launch of Channel 4 in 1982 also bolstered Border's network portfolio – providing extra finance for many of the new programmes being produced from the Carlisle studios (themselves being expanded) and commissioning to make a number of programmes, most notably Land of the Lakes (presented by Melvyn Bragg), a music show entitled Bliss (hosted by Muriel Gray) and Border's very first sitcom, The Groovy Fellers with Jools Holland and Rowland Rivron.

Border also expanded into children's programming during the 1980s with The Joke Machine, Crush A Grape, Pick A Number, Krankies Television, BMX Beat and contributions to Saturday morning series Get Fresh and Ghost Train (produced in conjunction with Tyne Tees Television, and others). Melvyn Bragg went on to become deputy chairman of Border Television in 1985 and its chairman in 1990. In 1996, he left the post but remained on the board.

Opt-out services
In 1989, Border began providing a sub-regional service for Scottish Borders viewers served by the Selkirk transmitter, consisting of a short opt-out during Lookaround each weeknight. In April 1999, the opt-out was extended to cover Dumfries and Galloway and a dedicated Scottish news bulletin was introduced on weekday lunchtimes.

The following August, Border began to use the opt-out service to provide split coverage of sports and occasional political programming. The station also opened an Edinburgh bureau to provide coverage of the Scottish Parliament.

Acquisition and takeover
Border was unopposed in retaining its ITV franchise in 1991, with a bid of £52,000 per year (or £1,000 per week).

In 1993, Border began its first venture into commercial radio when it was awarded the licence for a new regional radio station serving Central Scotland – Scot FM – in partnership with Grampian Television. By May 1995, Grampian had bought out Border's stake in the company.

Border's second venture was Century Radio, conceived as the second regional station for North East England, on 1 September 1994, with John Myers (a former continuity announcer) as managing director and John Simons as programming director. During the rest of the 1990s, Border launched an additional Century radio station in Manchester while holding interests in a number of other stations including Sun FM in Sunderland and Cumbria's CFM Radio, and in 1997 formed a subsidiary, Border Radio Holdings, for its radio business.

In March 2000, a takeover battle broke out between Capital Radio and Scottish Radio Holdings for Border – the latter went on to state that Border's ongoing status as a truly independent media business was no longer a realistic option in a consolidating industry. By April, Capital Radio had purchased the company and the following year sold Border's television assets to Granada Media Group for £50.5 million. Rumours over its future persistently dogged Border and it trod a difficult path to balance the interests of three different nations. As with many of the other ITV regional stations, a steady reduction in the range and quantity of its output continued its decline.

In July 2006, it was announced that the Berwick-upon-Tweed transmitter was to transfer to Tyne Tees as part of the preparations for the digital switchover of the Border region in 2008, and to bring Berwick into line with the rest of the North East which was scheduled to switch over to digital in 2012. The transfer took effect from 13 December 2006, although Border news programmes still carry stories about Berwick-upon-Tweed due to its proximity to the eastern Scottish Borders.

Merger

In 2008, the United Kingdom began its five-year programme to cease analogue television broadcasts as part of the switchover to Digital television starting with Border.

Towards the end of his tenure as ITV plc executive chairman, Michael Grade began dismantling the ITV regional layout, arguing the existence of ITV Border "no longer makes sense" relative to the regional audience it serves. On 12 September 2007, Grade announced plans to close ITV Border and merge the region with ITV Tyne Tees.

On 25 September 2008, Ofcom gave ITV the go ahead to merge the Border and Tyne Tees operations from early in 2009. Following a survey of Isle of Man viewers in autumn 2008, coverage of the Isle of Man was transferred from ITV Border to ITV Granada on Thursday 16 July 2009. ITV Border still serves the northern portions of the Isle of Man to this day.

ITV Border's own regional news service ceased production on Tuesday 24 February 2009, replaced by a dual-regional service the next day. The sub-regional service for southern Scotland was also closed. The main ITV Border newsroom is now based in the Kingstown area of Carlisle with reporters living and working in Carlisle, Dumfries, Edinburgh, Kendal, Selkirk and Whitehaven.

ITV Border won the RTS awards for Best News Programme: Nations and Regions for Lookaround, whilst ITV Tyne Tees & Border was nominated in three categories in February 2011.

Restoring a full regional service
On 23 July 2013, proposals to reintroduce a full service of news and regional programmes for the ITV Border region were approved by OFCOM. In September 2013, Lookaround was restored as a full half-hour programme on weekdays with shorter daytime and weekend bulletins reintroduced during the month. The programme continues to be broadcast from Gateshead with extra journalists recruited for newsgathering in the Border region, including a Scottish political editor in Edinburgh, a sports correspondent and district reporters.

ITV Border was also required to reopen its former opt-out service for southern Scotland, previously used to broadcast split news bulletins and select STV programming. A minimum of 90 minutes a week of bespoke local programming is broadcast on ITV Border Scotland while viewers in Cumbria continue to receive network output. The opt-out service was launched on Monday 6 January 2014 and initially broadcast over Freeview only, with programmes also available on the ITV Border website. From mid-March 2015, the split Border Scotland service became available to satellite viewers, replacing Border (England) in the relevant area.

Studios

Unlike some of the new ITV stations at the time, Border constructed a purpose-built studio centre, located in Brunel Way, Carlisle. The complex contained two production studios, a small continuity studio and a film interview studio. These were converted to colour with the station and were expanded and upgraded when demand increased following the launch of Channel 4.

Following the merger of ITV Border's service with that of ITV Tyne Tees, the Border studios were closed and demolished in 2010. A new office for Border's news and advertising operations was opened in the Kingstown area of Carlisle with news reports being sent via file server to the ITV Tyne Tees & Border studios in Gateshead from where Lookaround and ITV News Border are broadcast.

ITV Border also maintains a bureau for Scottish Parliament coverage in Edinburgh with district news reporters and camera crews based locally in Dumfries, Galloway, Kendal, Selkirk and Whitehaven. The Edinburgh bureau produces the southern Scotland political programme, Representing Border.

Identity

Throughout its history until its rebranding as "ITV Border", Border Television used the same logo, an abstract symbol known affectionately by locals as "the chopsticks". It features a thick shape with a forker line crossing it and running either side of the shape, which divides the area into three parts, representing Scotland above the line, England below it, and the Solway Firth in the small area to the left.

The launch identity was a black caption with the white logo and "Border Television" beneath, over an announcement. The start-up routine was symbolic because of its distinctive and unchanging music and the announcement stating: "This is Border Television, coming to you from the Caldbeck, Selkirk and Richmond Hill transmitters of the Independent Television Authority." and then, "This is Border Television broadcasting to Cumbria, South Scotland, the Isle of Man and North and West Northumberland, from the Caldbeck, Selkirk and associated transmitters of the Independent Broadcasting Authority." This was replaced when colour came to the region by the same contents, contained within a rectangle on a blue background with a Colour caption outside the box. The colour caption was removed in the 1980s and the announcement said: "This is Border Television providing a full colour service to Cumbria, South Scotland, the Isle of Man and North and West Northumberland including Berwick-upon-Tweed, from the Caldbeck, Selkirk and associated transmitters of the Independent Broadcasting Authority."

Border finally adopted an animated ident on 1 September 1989 when they adopted the ITV Generic look and used it until 5 September 1993. Their version was mildly well suited, as the contents of the traditional Border logo were recognisable in the "V" segment of the logo. This look was extensively used, even in the news department. On 6 September 1993, the ident was changed to the Border logo revolving out of thin air and featuring a background of pastel colours. The music was retained from the generic look. Border also began to use in-vision continuity more heavily.

On 5 September 1994, the logo was updated into a 3D version, this ident features a 3D Border logo falling into place against an icy-cold cyan backdrop, which was set to the same as 1989 ITV Generic theme, and it remained for nearly 12 months until 31 August 1995. Border also to use the same in-vision continuity again.

On 1 September 1995, the logo was changed again with two different idents, a same 3D Border logo falling into place against a water-effect blue backdrop, which was set to the same tune as used previously but later played on instruments to match the water theme. In another one, with the same sequence against a backdrop of spinning discs and blue and purple colours. New music was also composed featuring deep basses. The whole effect was to make Border have an authoritative and broadcaster tone. This package remained for four years until 7 November 1999.

On 8 November 1999, Border adopted the second generic look along with the rest of the regions, but did not use their logo in this look. From then on, Border only used network designs for idents; as from 28 October 2002, Border idents featuring a celebrity with the ITV1 logo with the word Border underneath were used for local programming only. All other programming used network idents and from 1 November 2004 no regional idents existed. Local productions are now attributed on-screen to 'ITV News and Current Affairs Border' and ITV Border.

Programmes
Children's programmes
 Border Birthdays

Current programmes

 Border Life (Southern Scotland only)
 ITV News Border
 Around the House (also broadcast on ITV Tyne Tees)
 ITV News Lookaround
 Representing Border (Southern Scotland only)
 Border Sport in Focus (Southern Scotland only)

Past programmes

 The Andy Stewart Show
 APB
 Basil's Joke Machine
 Bliss (1985)
 BMX Beat
 Border Folk
 Border Forum (1970–77)
 Border Greats
 Border Month (1972–79)
 Border Parliamentary Report (1972–78)
 Border Stories (1999–2004)
 Cock of the Border (1960s)
 Coconuts (1990)
 Crush a Grape
 Galloway Ceilidh (1979
 Hindsight (1981–87)
 Homegrown
 Krankies Television/K.T.V.
 Krazy Kitchen
 Law of the Lakes
 Look Who's Talking
 Mr. and Mrs.
 Nature Trail
 Pick a Number (1984–86)
 Revelations (1984–88)
 Scene Shed (1980s)
 Studio One (1976-80s)
 The Joke Machine (1989)
 The Sound of .... (1970–81)
 The Union and the League
 Take the Mick
 Trailblazing
 Try For Ten (1968–84)
 Vegetable Village (1965)
 Way of the Lakes

References

Further reading
 Mary Scott Parker (1999), Border Television: A History. Carlisle: Bookcase

External links

Border
Border
Anglo-Scottish border
Mass media in Cumbria
Television channels and stations established in 1961
Television channels in Scotland
Companies based in Carlisle, Cumbria